Lillian Aujo is a Ugandan author. In 2009, she was the winner of the Babishai Niwe (BN) Poetry Foundation's inaugural BN poetry prize. In 2015, she was longlisted for, and won the Inaugural Jalada Prize for Literature for her story "Where pumpkin leaves dwell".

Writing
Aujo is a member of Femrite. Her works "The Eye of Poetry" and "Getting Nowhere" were published in Suubi, a publication of the African Writers Trust. She attended the Caine Prize workshop 2013, and her story "Red" was published in the anthology A Memory This Size and Other Stories: The Caine Prize for African Writing 2013. Her work has appeared in anthologies by Femrite, "Talking tales" and "Summoning the rains".

Published works

Short stories
 "Red" in 
 "My big toe", in 
"Where pumpkin leaves dwell"
"Getting nowhere" in The Suubi Collection (2013)

Poetry
"Soft Tonight", in 
 "Soft Tonight", in 
"Born in these Times" in Bakwa, 2013
"The eye of poetry" in The Suubi Collection (2013)
"Fresh Coat of Paint" in the revelatormagazine

References

External links 
"Poetry and my writing club"

Living people
Ugandan women short story writers
Ugandan short story writers
21st-century Ugandan women writers
21st-century Ugandan poets
Kumusha
Ugandan women poets
21st-century short story writers
Year of birth missing (living people)